Vienna is a town in Clark County, South Dakota, United States. The population was 49 at the 2020 census.

A large share of the early settlers were natives of Austria who named the village after the Austrian capital.

Geography

Vienna is located at  (44.703645, -97.500277).

Vienna has been assigned the ZIP code 57271 and the FIPS place code 67220.

Demographics

2010 census
As of the census of 2010, there were 45 people, 18 households, and 10 families residing in the town. The racial makeup of the town was 95.6% White and 4.4% from two or more races.

There were 18 households, of which 22.2% had children under the age of 18 living with them, 44.4% were married couples living together, 11.1% had a female householder with no husband present, and 44.4% were non-families. 44.4% of all households were made up of individuals, and 22.3% had someone living alone who was 65 years of age or older. The average household size was 2.50 and the average family size was 3.70.

The median age in the town was 44.5 years. 31.1% of residents were under the age of 18; 6.7% were between the ages of 18 and 24; 13.3% were from 25 to 44; 33.4% were from 45 to 64; and 15.6% were 65 years of age or older. The gender makeup of the town was 46.7% male and 53.3% female.

2000 census
As of the census of 2000, there were 78 people, 28 households, and 16 families residing in the town. The population density was 92.7 people per square mile (35.9/km2). There were 41 housing units at an average density of 48.7 per square mile (18.8/km2). The racial makeup of the town was 94.87% White, 1.28% Native American, and 3.85% from two or more races. Hispanic or Latino of any race were 5.13% of the population.

There were 28 households, out of which 39.3% had children under the age of 18 living with them, 53.6% were married couples living together, 7.1% had a female householder with no husband present, and 39.3% were non-families. 35.7% of all households were made up of individuals, and 21.4% had someone living alone who was 65 years of age or older. The average household size was 2.79 and the average family size was 3.82.

In the town, the population was spread out, with 41.0% under the age of 18, 3.8% from 18 to 24, 25.6% from 25 to 44, 11.5% from 45 to 64, and 17.9% who were 65 years of age or older. The median age was 30 years. For every 100 females, there were 85.7 males. For every 100 females age 18 and over, there were 91.7 males.

The median income for a household in the town was $16,875, and the median income for a family was $25,625. Males had a median income of $28,750 versus $18,750 for females. The per capita income for the town was $5,244. There were 11.1% of families and 14.3% of the population living below the poverty line, including 6.3% of under eighteens and 15.4% of those over 64.

References

Towns in Clark County, South Dakota
Towns in South Dakota